Bolívar el héroe (lit. Bolivar the hero) is a Colombian anime influenced animated film about the life of Simon Bolivar.

It tells the story of the Liberator Simón Bolívar through characters and situations of fiction. For example, attempts were made to simplify the conflict against Spain by creating the composite character "Tyrannical", symbolizing Spanish evil and oppression. Its counterpart is "Américo", who represents the slavery and the craving for freedom of the people.
Its budget has never been revealed exactly by the producers, but thanks to information given by Míquel Diaz Ramajo it is known that through personal messages, one of the producers of the film (Miguel Angel Vasquez Aguirre) Of giving the money for the film was in effect the director, Guillermo del Rincon who used 70,000 dollars for it.

It premiered on December 25, 2003, stayed in theatres for over 4 weeks.

The movie received extremely negative reception, mostly attribute to its poor animation quality.

Film festivals 

 II Festival de animación de Maracaibo, Venezuela - February 17–22, 2004
 Festival Iberoamericano, Montreal, Canada - October 16–22, 2004
 Primera muestra de cine colombiano en Porto Alegre, Brazil - December 1–8, 2004 
 Festival Internacional del Nuevo Cine Hispanoamericano - Havana, Cuba - December 2004
 Festival de Cine de animación - Valparaíso, Chile - April 2005
 IV Festival Infantil y Juvenil 2005 Quito, Ecuador - August 2005
 VII Festival Internacional de Cine de Cartagena para Niños y Jóvenes Cartagena, Colombia - October 2005
 San Juan CINEMAFEST de Puerto Rico. San Juan, Puerto Rico - October 2005
 Feria del Libro de Guadalajara - Invitado especial Colombia. Guadalajara, México - November 2007

See also 
Anime-influenced animation
Simón Bolívar (1942 film)
Simón Bolívar (1969 film)
The Liberator (film)

External links 
 
 
 Whole movie on YouTube

2003 animated films
2003 films
Cultural depictions of Simón Bolívar
Colombian animated films
Animation based on real people
Colombian historical films